Frances Theresa Densmore (May 21, 1867 – June 5, 1957) was an American anthropologist and ethnographer born in Red Wing, Minnesota. Densmore is known for her studies of Native American music and culture, and in modern terms, she may be described as an ethnomusicologist.

Biography
As a child Densmore developed an appreciation of music by listening to the nearby Dakota Indians. She studied music at Oberlin College for three years. During the early part of the twentieth century, she worked as a music teacher with Native Americans nationwide, while also learning, recording, and transcribing their music, and documenting its use in their culture. She helped preserve their culture in a time when government policy was to encourage Native Americans to adopt Western customs.

Densmore began recording music officially for the Smithsonian Institution's Bureau of American Ethnology (BAE) in 1907.  In her fifty-plus years of studying and preserving American Indian music, she collected thousands of recordings.  Many of the recordings she made on behalf of the BAE now are held in the Library of Congress.  While her original recordings often were on wax cylinders, many of them have been reproduced using other media and are included in other archives.  The recordings may be accessed by researchers as well as tribal delegations.

Some of the tribes she worked with include the Chippewa, the Mandan, Hidatsa, the Sioux, the northern Pawnee of Oklahoma, the Papago of Arizona, Indians of Washington and British Columbia, Winnebago and Menominee of Wisconsin, Pueblo Indians of the southwest, the Seminoles of Florida, and even the Kuna Indians of Panama.
Densmore frequently was published in the journal American Anthropologist, contributing consistently throughout her career. Her manuscript A Study of Some Michigan Indians (1949) was the first publication in the  University of Michigan Press American Anthropologist monograph series.

She wrote The Indians and Their Music in 1926. Between 1910 and 1957, she published fourteen book-length bulletins for the Smithsonian, each describing the musical practices and repertories of a different Native American group. These were reprinted as a series by DaCapo Press in 1972.

She also was a part of "A Ventriloquy of Anthros" in the American Indian Quarterly along with James Owen Dorsey and Eugene Buechel.

Awards
Oberlin College awarded Densmore an honorary M.A. degree in 1924. Macalester College followed suit in 1950, awarding her an honorary Doctor of Letters degree. In 1954, the Minnesota Historical Society recognized her with its first-ever "Citation for Distinguished Service in the Field of Minnesota History."

The National Association for American Composers and Conductors recognized Densmore in its 1940-1941 awards for her musicological work.

Publications
 Chippewa Music (Washington DC, 1910–13/R)
 Teton Sioux Music (Washington DC, 1918/R, 2/1992)
 Northern Ute Music (Washington DC, 1922/R)
 Mandan and Hidatsa Music (Washington DC, 1923/R)
 The American Indians and their Music (New York, 1926/R, 2/1937)
 Papago Music (Washington DC, 1929/R)
 Pawnee Music (Washington DC, 1929/R)
 Menominee Music (Washington DC, 1932/R)
 Yuman and Yaqui Music (Washington DC, 1932/R)
 Cheyenne and Arapaho Music (Los Angeles, 1936)
 Music of Santo Domingo Pueblo, New Mexico (Los Angeles, 1938)
 Nootka and Quileute Music (Washington DC, 1939/R)
 Music of the Indians of British Columbia (Washington DC, 1943/R)
 Choctaw Music (Washington DC, 1943/R)
 Seminole Music (Washington DC, 1956/R)
 Music of Acoma, Isleta, Cochiti and Zuni Pueblos (Washington DC, 1957/R)

Discography
Smithsonian-Densmore Cylinder Collection (1910-1930) 
Includes: 
Songs of the Chippewa 
Songs of the Sioux 
Songs of the Yuma, Cocopa, and Yaqui 
Songs of the Pawnee and Northern Ute 
Songs of the Papago 
Songs of the Nootka and Quileute 
Songs of the Menominee, Mandan and Hidatsa

See also
 Women in musicology

References

External links
Frances Densmore in MNopedia, the Minnesota Encyclopedia
Bureau of American Ethnology, Bulletin 80: Mandan and Hidatsa Music, Frances Densmore
Bureau of American Ethnology, Bulletin 161: Seminole Music, Frances Densmore
Finding Aids to Collections in the Smithsonian Archive of Folk Culture, includes a finding aide for a Densmore collection of wax cylinders.
Frances Densmore page from Minnesota Public Radio
Frances Densmore Minnesota Historical Society
"The Study of Indian Music" by Frances Densmore, in the Smithsonian Annual Report for 1941; includes good information on Densmore's equipment and methodology.
Densmore, Frances from Grove Music Online
Hofmann, Charles, and Densmore, Frances. Frances Densmore and American Indian music. Museum of the American Indian, Heye Foundation, 1968. doi: 10.5479/sil.451250.39088016102741

1867 births
1957 deaths
American ethnomusicologists
American ethnographers
People from Red Wing, Minnesota
Native American music
Smithsonian Institution people
American anthropologists
American women anthropologists
Early Recording Engineers (1930-1959)
American audio engineers
Oberlin College alumni
20th-century American non-fiction writers
20th-century American women writers